Mary Lawlor may refer to:

Mary Lawlor (actress) (1907-1977)
Mary Lawlor (human rights advocate) (born 1952)